Group B was one of four groups of the 2007 AFC Asian Cup. The group's first round of matches began on 8 July and its last matches were played on 16 July. All matches were played in Vietnam, with five of them played at the Mỹ Đình National Stadium in Hanoi. The group consisted of hosts Vietnam, Japan, Qatar and the United Arab Emirates.

Standings 

All times are UTC+7.

Vietnam vs United Arab Emirates

Japan vs Qatar

Qatar vs Vietnam

United Arab Emirates vs Japan

Vietnam vs Japan

Qatar vs United Arab Emirates 

Group
2007 in Japanese football
2007–08 in Emirati football
2007 in Vietnamese football
2007–08 in Qatari football